Lower Woodcott is a small village in the Basingstoke and Deane district of Hampshire, Englannd.   Its nearest town is Whitchurch, which lies approximately 4.3 miles (6.7 km) south-east from the village.

Governance
The village is part of the civil parish of Litchfield and Woodcott, and is part of the Burghclere, Highclere and St Mary Bourne ward of Basingstoke and Deane borough council. The borough council is a Non-metropolitan district of Hampshire County Council.

References

External links

Villages in Hampshire